The Equestrian events included three disciplines: dressage, eventing, and show jumping, and were held at the Deodoro Military Club.

The competition is broken down into an individual and team competition for each discipline, for a total of 42 medals awarded. There are three members per team and one reserve rider in the dressage, and up to 4 team members in the eventing competition with only the top 3 member's scores taken for the final results.

Dressage results

The dressage team riders complete a test at Prix St. George level, and the individual riders complete a PSG and Intermediate I level test, with the top 15 competitors moving on to ride for medals in an Intermediate I Freestyle test.

Team dressage
The team results qualified Canada and Brazil to compete at the 2008 Olympic Games in dressage.

Individual dressage

Eventing results
The eventers complete a 3-star level dressage test, stadium, and cross-country course. 5 teams competed in the eventing competition: Argentina, Brazil, Canada, Chile, and the United States.

After the dressage test, the United States led with 143.40 penalty points, closely followed by Canada with 159.90 penalties, then host country Brazil with 173.20 in third, Argentina in 4th, and Chile in 5th.

The cross-country course was designed by Sue Benson of Great Britain. Run over 10 minutes, the 5,700-meter course had 27 obstacles and a total of 41 jumping efforts. After the cross-country phase, the Americans were in the gold medal position, with 154.80 penalties, followed by Canada with 177.10 penalty points, and bronze-medal placed Brazil with 192.60. Of the 26 horses which began cross-country, 21 finished. The teams from Argentina and Chile were eliminated during the cross-country phase.

All 21 horses made it through Sunday jog, moving on to the stadium course. Designed by Brazilian Guilherme Jorge, it was composed of 12 jumps with 15 obstacles, over 490 meters. Rails were quite common, with only 4 horses finishing without jump penalties and only 3 of those four going double-clear without any time penalties. The Americans finished the competition with the gold medal, the Canadians with the silver, and Brazil with the bronze.

Team eventing
The team results qualified Canada and Brazil to compete at the 2008 Olympic Games in eventing.

Individual eventing

Show jumping results
17 countries were represented in the show jumping competition, and there were a total of 10 teams: Argentina, Brazil (defending bronze medalists), Canada, Chile, Colombia, Ecuador, Guatemala, Mexico (defending silver medalists), the United States (defending gold medalists), and Venezuela.

The competition for team medals occurs over 2 days. Courses were all designed by Brazilian Guilherme Jorge, who also designed at the 2005 and 2007 World Cup Finals.
 Thursday, July 26: Table C Speed Class, max height 1.45m
 Friday, July 27: Table A Nations' Cup (2 rounds), max height 1.50m

The individual competition will then begin.
 Sunday, July 29: Table A (2 rounds), max height 1.60m

Team show jumping 
The team results qualified Canada, Brazil, and Mexico to compete at the 2008 Olympic Games in show jumping.

Individual show jumping

References

Events at the 2007 Pan American Games
2007
2007 in equestrian
Equestrian sports competitions in Brazil